Gonzague Vandooren (born 19 August 1979 in Mouscron) is a retired Belgian professional football player who was last attached to Lierse SK, being released following the 2011–12 season. His position on the field is left back.

External links

Gonzague Vandooren player info at sporza.be 

1979 births
Living people
People from Mouscron
Belgian footballers
Belgium youth international footballers
Belgium under-21 international footballers
Association football defenders
Royal Excel Mouscron players
Belgian Pro League players
Lierse S.K. players
Standard Liège players
K.R.C. Genk players
Footballers from Hainaut (province)